Kolah Deraz-e Vosta (also Romanized as Kolāh Derāz-e Vosţá; also known as Kolāh Derāz-e Javānmīr, Kolāh Derāz-e Javānmīr-e Soflá, and Ūloyar) is a village in Cheleh Rural District, in the Central District of Gilan-e Gharb County, Kermanshah Province, Iran. At the 2006 census, its population was 212, in 55 families.

References 

Populated places in Gilan-e Gharb County